Judo was contested at the 2015 Summer Universiade from July 4 to 8 at the Yeomju Bitgoeul Gymnasium in Gwangju, South Korea.

Medal summary

Medal table

Men's events

Women's events

References

External links
 
 2015 Summer Universiade – Judo

2015
 
Universiade
2015 Summer Universiade events
2015 Universiade